Vikaramaditya V (r. 1008–1015 CE) succeeded Satyashraya on the Western Chalukya throne. Vikramaditya was born to Dashavarman (alias Yashovarman), the younger son of the dynasty's founder Tailapa II, and his wife Bhagyavati. He was Satyashraya's nephew and had a very uneventful short reign.

Vikramaditya V was followed on the throne by his brother Jayasimha II in 1015.

References

Bibliography 
 Nilakanta Sastri, K. A. (1955). A History of South India, OUP, New Delhi (Reprinted 2002).
 

1015 deaths
11th-century Indian monarchs
Western Chalukya Empire
Year of birth unknown